The Golden Crown ( Tāj-e Talāyi) was Iran's first national aerobatics display team and part of the former Imperial Iranian Air Force from 1958 to 1979. It was formed by Nader Jahanbani, an Iranian fighter pilot, and mainly inspired by the USAFE , an American aerobatics team. During the cold war this team successfully performed in many competitions.

The Golden Crown was officially founded in 1958. Fourteen Iranian pilots were sent to Fürstenfeldbruck Air Base, Germany, for jet aircraft pilot training. Nine of them returned to Iran after a couple of months while five remained and underwent further training in order to become instructors. One of the five pilots, Nader Jahanbani, happened to observe a practice session of the USAFE Skyblazers at Fürstenfeldbruck. After displaying interest, Jahanbani was allowed to fly in the backseat of one of the team's F-84s during several practice demos. This inspired him to create the IIAF's own demonstration team. With the Shah's blessing, Jahanbani and three of the four remaining Iranian pilots, Amir Hossein Rabii, Siamak Jahanbini, and Abdolhossein Minusepehr formed the Golden Crown aerobatic team. They were joined by Gen. Mohammad Amir Khatami, who became its fifth member.  After 72 training sessions, the team performed its first aerobatic display in 1958. It was equipped with four Republic F-84G Thunderjet aircraft. By 1959, they used nine F-84s.

The team performed near Mehrabad International Airport and later, at Kooshk Nosrat, 100 kilometres from Tehran.

During the Iranian Revolution in 1979, the team was disbanded after the dissolution of the Imperial Iranian Air Force.

IIAF ace, Yadollah Javadpour, was a member of the Golden Crown from 1975 to 1978. Other notable members include Mohammad Amir Khatami, Nader Jahanbani, Amir Hossein Rabii, Asghar Imanian, Bahram Hooshyar, and Yadollah Sharifirad.

In February 2020, Aziz Nasirzadeh had announced the revival of the team.

See also 
 Yadollah Sharifirad

References

External links

Golden Crown year by year

 
Aerobatic teams
Imperial Iranian Air Force